And Still I Rise is the debut album by British singer Alison Limerick, released in 1992 by Arista Records. It is best known for the lead single "Where Love Lives", which was mixed by David Morales and Frankie Knuckles. It peaked at number 3 on the U.S. Hot Dance Club Play in 1991. The other single released from the album was "Make It On My Own". The tracks on this album were produced by Lati Kronlund, Steve Anderson, Arthur Baker, David Barratt and John Waddell.

Track listing

Charts

References

Alison Limerick albums
1992 debut albums
Arista Records albums
Albums produced by Arthur Baker (musician)